Porfirio is a 2011 Colombian drama film directed by Alejandro Landes. The film premiered at the 2011 Cannes Film Festival and subsequently screened at other festivals including Toronto and Maryland. It won Golden Peacock (Best Film) at the 42nd International Film Festival of India.

The film is based on the real-life story of Porfirio Ramirez, who is cast to play himself. Porfirio is paraplegic after being shot by a rogue police officer.  The film won the Golden Peacock Award for Best Film at the 42nd International Film Festival of India.

Cast
 Porfirio Ramirez as himself
 Jarlinsson Ramirez as himself (referred to as "Lissin")
 Yor Jasbleidy Santos as herself

References

External links
 

2011 films
2011 drama films
2010s Spanish-language films
Colombian drama films
2010s Colombian films